Chwale is a village on the Zanzibari island of Pemba. It is located in the northeast of the island, eight kilometres southeast of Wete. This village is locally famous for its annual bullfights in October.

References

Finke, J. (2006) The Rough Guide to Zanzibar (2nd edition). New York: Rough Guides.

Villages in Zanzibar
Pemba Island
Pemba North Region